Southwestern New Mexico is a region of the U.S. state of New Mexico commonly defined by Hidalgo County, Grant County, Catron County, Luna County, Doña Ana County, Sierra County, and Socorro County. Some important towns there are Lordsburg, Silver City, Deming, Las Cruces, Truth or Consequences, Socorro, Reserve, and Rodeo. Natural attractions there include White Sands National Park, the Organ Mountains, Bosque del Apache National Wildlife Refuge, and the Gila Wilderness surrounding the Gila Cliff Dwellings National Monument. Southwestern New Mexico is also home to both the Very Large Array and White Sands Missile Range containing the Trinity Site.

Regions of New Mexico